Andy Williams' Best is a compilation album by American pop singer Andy Williams that was released late in 1961 by Cadence Records.  This second album to compile the singer's material features 10 songs that made the Billboard Hot 100 along with two of their corresponding B-sides.

The album made its first appearance on the Billboard Top LP's chart in the issue dated April 7, 1962, and remained there for 44 weeks, peaking at number 59.

In 1965 Columbia Records released a compilation by Williams called Canadian Sunset whose cover had the phrase "formerly titled Andy Williams' Best" underneath the title, but his number one hit "Butterfly" and its top 10 follow-up "I Like Your Kind of Love" that were included on this album were replaced on the Columbia release with the B-sides of two of the other songs here.

Andy Williams' Best was issued on compact disc for the first time as one of two albums on one CD by Collectables Records on September 12, 2000, the other album being Williams's Cadence release from the fall of 1960, Under Paris Skies.  Collectables included this CD in a box set entitled Classic Album Collection, Vol. 1, which contains 17 of his studio albums and three compilations and was released on June 26, 2001.

Track listing

Side one
 "The Bilbao Song" (Bertolt Brecht, Johnny Mercer, Kurt Weill) - 2:15
rec. 3/9/61; Billboard Hot 100: #37  
 "Lonely Street" (Carl Belew, Kenny Sowder, W.S. Stevenson) - 2:46
 rec. 8/23/59; Billboard Hot 100: #5, Hot R&B Sides: #20
 "(In the Summertime) You Don't Want My Love" (Roger Miller) - 2:16
 rec. 10/17/60; Billboard Hot 100: #64
 "The Village of St. Bernadette" (Eula Parker) - 3:22
 rec. 11/19/59; Billboard Hot 100: #7
 "Canadian Sunset" (Norman Gimbel, Eddie Heywood) - 2:37
recorded 7/2/56; Top 100: #8  
 "How Wonderful to Know" (Salvatore d'Esposito, Kermit Goell, Domenico Titomanlio) - 2:21
rec. 3/9/61; B-side of "The Bilbao Song"

Side two
 "The Hawaiian Wedding Song" (Al Hoffman, Charles E. King, Dick Manning) - 2:29
 rec. 11/3/58; Billboard Hot 100: #11
 "Do You Mind?" (Lionel Bart) - 2:17
 rec. 5/18/60; Billboard Hot 100: #70
 "Are You Sincere?" (Wayne Walker) - 2:41
 rec. 12/12/57; Billboard Hot 100: #3
 "I Like Your Kind of Love" (Melvin Endsley) - 2:30
rec. 6/16/57; Top 100: #9  
 "Don't Go to Strangers" (Redd Evans, Arthur Kent, David Mann) - 2:56
rec. 10/17/60; B-side of "(In the Summertime) You Don't Want My Love"
 "Butterfly" (Bernie Lowe, Kal Mann) - 2:21
rec. 1/23/57; Top 100: #1 (3 weeks) 

 Some of the tracks on this compilation were released before Billboard created its Hot 100 chart for tracking song performance.

Personnel 

Andy Williams - vocalist
Archie Bleyer - arranger, conductor

References

Bibliography

1961 greatest hits albums
Andy Williams compilation albums 
Cadence Records compilation albums
Albums conducted by Archie Bleyer